Transportation in Nauru includes pedestrian, bicycle, automobile, train, and airplane.

Air
Nauru has one airport, Nauru International Airport. Nauru Airlines, which flies to Brisbane, Australia; Majuro, Marshall Islands; Nadi, Fiji; and Tarawa, Kiribati, is the only airline to fly to the airport. There are five aeroplanes in service.

Rail

Rail transport is used for moving phosphate from the island's interior to the cantilever jetties on the island's western coast, in Aiwo District. For this purpose, a 3,900 m long, 0.61 m narrow gauge railway was built by the Pacific Phosphate Company in 1907.

References

External links